Deh Now-e Kukhdan (also Romanized as Deh Now-e Kūkhdān; also known as Deh Now) is a village in Dana Rural District, in the Central District of Dana County, Kohgiluyeh and Boyer-Ahmad Province, Iran. At the 2006 census, its population was 145, in 29 families.

References 

Populated places in Dana County